Stojanka Petković (born 22 August 1959) is a former Kosovo Serb politician. She served in the Assembly of Kosovo from 2001 to 2004 as part of the "Return" coalition and in the National Assembly of Serbia from 2007 to 2012 as a member of G17 Plus.

Early life and career
Petković was born in Leposavić, in what was then the Autonomous Region of Kosovo and Metohija in the People's Republic of Serbia, Federal People's Republic of Yugoslavia. She graduated in economics at Kosovska Mitrovica and worked as an import and export consultant at RMHK Trepča from 1982 to 2004, when she became head of finance for the kindergarten in Zvečan. She earned a master's degree in 2010.

Politician

Kosovo representative
An opponent of Slobodan Milošević's administration in the 1990s, Petković entered political life as a member of the Social Democracy party. She was elected to the Assembly of Kosovo as a candidate of the Serb community's "Return" coalition in the 2001 Kosovo assembly election, which was held under the auspices of the United Nations Interim Administration Mission in Kosovo (UNMIK). The coalition received twenty-two mandates in the 120-member chamber, which was dominated by parties from the province's majority Albanian community. Relations between the Albanian and Serb communities were generally poor in the aftermath of the Kosovo War (1998–99), and Petković later recounted that there was little interaction between the Albanian and Serb delegates; on one occasion, she said that an Albanian colleague who had joined her for coffee was criticized for fraternizing with a Serb. During her time in the assembly, Petković was the chair of the labour and social policy committee as well as a member of the budget committee and the Organization for Security and Co-operation in Europe (OSCE) working group on the law on elections in Kosovo. She did not seek re-election in the 2004 Kosovo election, which was largely boycotted by the Serb community.

Petković was appointed as the Serbian government's commissioner for labour, employment, and social policy for Kosovo and Metohija in 2002 and held the position until 2006. In February 2005, she was appointed as a member of the Serbian government's newly formed Council for Kosovo-Metohija.

Parliamentarian
Social Democracy contested the 2003 Serbian parliamentary election as part of the four-party "Defense and Justice" coalition, and Petković appeared in the 174th position on the coalition's electoral list. The list did not cross the electoral threshold to win representation in the assembly.

She subsequently left Social Democracy and joined G17 Plus, appearing in the 162nd position on that party's list for the 2007 Serbian parliamentary election. The list won nineteen seats, and she was included in its assembly delegation. (From 2000 to 2011, Serbian parliamentary mandates were awarded to sponsoring parties or coalitions rather than to individual candidates, and it was common practice for the mandates to be awarded out of numerical order. Petković's position on the list – which was in any event mostly alphabetical – had no specific bearing on her chances of election.) G17 Plus participated in Serbia's coalition government after the election, and Petković served in parliament as a supporter of the administration. She was a member of the assembly committee for Kosovo and Metohija.

In October 2007, Petković said that the Albanian National Army paramilitary group posed a serious threat to the province's Serb population. She was quoted as saying, "Serbs in northern Kosovo are well organized and ready to defend themselves. We hope they will continue to be prepared to defend themselves and their property."

G17 Plus initially intended to participate in the 2007 Kosovan local elections despite calls from within the Serb community for a boycott, and Petković was registered in the lead position on the party's list for Zvečan. The party withdrew from the elections after the Serbian state endorsed the boycott, though it was too late by this time for the names of its candidates to be removed from the ballot. This fact notwithstanding, a Molotov cocktail was thrown at Petković's home shortly before the vote, and she later said it was extremely fortunate that no-one was hurt in the attack. She blamed organized criminal groups in the Serb community and speculated that she might become the first Serb to move out of Kosovo due to threatened violence from other Serbs.

Like most Kosovo Serbs, Petković opposed Kosovo's unilateral declaration of independence in 2008.

For the 2008 Serbian parliamentary election, G17 Plus was a part of the For a European Serbia coalition led by the Democratic Party (Demokratska stranka, DS). Petković appeared in the 165th position on the coalition's list and was chosen for another term in the assembly when the list won 102 out of 250 mandates. The overall results of the election were initially inconclusive, but For a European Serbia eventually formed a coalition government with the Socialist Party of Serbia (Socijalistička partija Srbije, SPS), and Petković continued to serve as a supporter of the administration. During her second term, she was a member of the Kosovo and Metohija committee and the committee on labour, veterans affairs, and social affairs, as well as the parliamentary friendship groups with Japan and Russia.

Serbia organized its own local elections in Kosovo in 2008; while not recognized by the international community, these provided de facto validation for local authorities in the Serb-dominated communities of northern Kosovo, including Zvečan. The Republic of Kosovo organized new local elections in 2009; Petković called for the Serb community to boycott the vote (as mostly occurred), in accordance with Serbian government's position.

Serbis's electoral system was reformed in 2011, such that parliamentary mandates were awarded in numerical order to candidates on successful lists. For the 2012 Serbian parliamentary election, G17 Plus formed an alliance with various local parties known as the United Regions of Serbia (Ujedinjeni regioni Srbije, URS). Petković was given the sixtieth position on the coalition's list; the list won only sixteen seats and she was not re-elected. She also led a URS list for Zvečan in concurrent local elections (which were not formally recognized by either Serbia and Kosovo) and was elected when the list won seven seats. Dragiša Milović of the Democratic Party of Serbia was confirmed as mayor after the election; Petković indicated that the URS was dissatisfied with the behaviour of the ruling majority following the vote and would not participate in the work of the assembly.

In May 2012, Petković endorsed the partition of Kosovo as a means of ensuring the Serb community in the north would remain integrated with Serbian institutions. G17 Plus formally merged into the United Regions of Serbia when the latter group was registered as a political party in April 2013, and Petković became a member of the revamped URS organization.

Petković was seriously injured in a car accident in November 2013. She has not returned to political life since this time.

Notes

References

1959 births
Living people
People from Leposavić
People from Zvečan
Kosovo Serbs
Members of the Assembly of Kosovo (UNMIK mandate until 2008)
Members of the National Assembly (Serbia)
Social Democracy (Serbia) politicians
G17 Plus politicians
United Regions of Serbia politicians